Vladimir Yaroshenko (Russian: Владимир Ярошенко; born November 2, 1985 in Slavyansk-na-Kubani) – Polish-Russian ballet dancer in type danseur noble, first soloist with Yury Grigorovich's Ballet Theatre, Krasnodar, trained in classical Russian ballet school. Polish resident since 2007, engaged with Teatr Wielki, Warsaw, where since September 2010 is a first soloist, and since January 2020 - a principal dancer of Polish National Ballet under direction of Krzysztof Pastor.

Russian beginnings 
Yaroshenko, a son of Ludimla and Aleksandr Yaroshenko, was born in Slavyansk-na-Kubani in Krasnodar Krai on the Russian South. He takes up folk dance in children's dance company at the age of seven, and in 1998 begins his classical ballet training in Choreographic School in Krasnodar. As a 3ed grade student he takes over the part of the Mouse King in The Nutcracker by Yury Grigorovich in his Ballet Theatre, Krasnodar and takes part in theatre's shows ever since. In 2003, after graduating he gets his first professional contract with Ballet Theatre in Krasnodar, immediately as a soloist.

In Krasnodar, Yaroshenko worked under Yury Grigorovich's supervision for four years, and in this time, he took over main male roles in his versions of Romeo and Juliet, Swan Lake, Raymonda, Le Corsaire and Legend of Love. But it was main role in famous Ivan the Terrible premiere to bring him the first soloist position. He performed with Ballet Theatre, Krasnodar on many major stages in Russia but also in USA, Japan, Spain, Italy, France or Ukraine and Kazakhstan. In the same time, he managed to graduate in pedagogy of ballet on Krasnodar State University of Culture and Arts.

In Poland 

Seeking for professional challenges other than Grigorovich's works, along with his wife Olga, who was also a dancer with the company, he decided to leave Krasnodar Ballet Theatre. At the invitation of his old teacher he moved to Lublin, Poland, where it was planned to create a new ballet company in Lublin Musical Theatre. He started working there since January 2007 bit soon it appeared that the plan failed, so he engaged with ballet company of Warsaw Teatr Wielki, under leadership of Jolanta Rybarska. In a short time, he took over main parts in The Nutcracker, Swan Lake, Romeo and Juliet and John Cranko's Oniegin. In 2009, when the company under direction of Krzysztof Pastor was elevated to the rank of Polish National Ballet, he was already a soloist and in September 2010 after Patrice Bart's premiere of Chopin the Romantic Artist he was promoted to first soloist. With Polish National Ballet, he performed in Saint Petersburg, Shanghai, Seville, Barcelona, Huston, New York, Washington, The Hague and Vilnius. In 2015, he performed as Chopin (Chopin the Romantic Artist gala programme) in Belweder Palace and as Casanova (Casanova in Warsaw gala programme) in Presidential Palace during special ballet evenings hosted by presidential couple. Yaroshenko also takes part in international ballet galas in Japan, Spain, Sweden, Latvia, Czech Republic, Estonia and Georgia. In 2016, he took part in Hamburg Ballet's tour to Tokio, where he danced Theseus-Oberon in John Neumeier's A Midsummer Night’s Dream. He received the Jan Kiepura Theatre Music Award twice for best male dancer (2014) and best classical male dancer in Poland (2017). In 2015, he and whole his family received Polish citizenship and in 2016 he was awarded by the Polish Minister of Culture and National Heritage the Bronze Medal for Merit to Culture ‘Gloria Artis’.

Major achievements

Yury Grigorovich's Ballet Theatre, Krasnodar 
 Prince Siegfried i Rothbart – Swan Lake by Yury Grigorovich
 Abderahman – Raymonda by Yury Grigorovich
 Romeo and Tybalt – Romeo and Juliet by Yury Grigorovich
 Birbanto – Le Corsaire by Yury Grigorovich
 Ferhad – Legend of Love by Yury Grigorovich
 Ivan IV – Ivan the Terrible by Yury Grigorovich

Teatr Wielki – Polish National Opera / Polish National Ballet 
 Prince – The Nutcracker by Andrzej Glegolski
 Prince Siegfried – Swan Lake by Irek Mukhamedov
 Romeo and Tybalt – Romeo and Juliet by Emil Wesołowski
 Lenski – Oniegin by John Cranko
 Fryderyk Chopin – Chopin the Romantic Artist by Patrice Bart
 Prince Désiré and Blue Bird – The Sleeping Beauty by Yury Grigorovich
 Soloist – Concerto Barocco by George Balanchine
 Prince – Cinderella by Frederick Ashton
 New Orpheus and other solo parts – Kurt Weill by Krzysztof Pastor
 Our Man, the Spirit and the Ominous – And the Rain Will Pass by Krzysztof Pastor
 Chosen Man – Le Sacre du printemps by Maurice Béjart
 Prince and the Nutcracker – The Nutcracker and the Mouse King by Toer van Schayk and Wayne Eagling
 Solor and Golden Idol – La Bayadère by Natalia Makarova
 Kain and Abel – Kain and Abel by Emil Wesołowski
 Duet 1 – Moving Rooms by Krzysztof Pastor
 Duet 2 and Solo – Artifact Suite by William Forsythe
 Theseus-Oberon and Lysander – A Midsummer Night’s Dream by John Neumeier
 Hamlet, Leartes and Claudius – Hamlet by Jacek Tyski
 First Aria – In Light and Shadow by Krzysztof Pastor
 Romeo – Romeo and Juliet by Krzysztof Pastor
 Duet 2 – Adagio & Scherzo by Krzysztof Pastor
 Basilio and Espada – Don Quixote by Alexei Fadeyechev
 Soloist – Soldiers’ Mass by Jiří Kylián
 Standard-bearer – The Green Table by Kurt Jooss
 Casanova – Casanova in Warsaw by Krzysztof Pastor
 Petruchio and Hortensio – The Taming of the Shrew by John Cranko
 Prospero and Ferdinand – The Tempest by Krzysztof Pastor
 Soloist – Chroma by Wayne McGregor
 Main Soloist – Bolero by Krzysztof Pastor
 Tsarevich Nicky – Swan Lake (with new libretto) by Krzysztof Pastor
 Soloist – Szymanowski's Violin Concerto No. 2 by Jacek Przybyłowicz
 Tansman – On a Stave (Tansman's Sextuor) by Jacek Tyski
 The Reborn – Chopins Concerto in F minor by Krzysztof Pastor
 Armand Duval – The Lady of the Camellias by John Neumeier
 Cześnik / The Squire – Sarmatian Parable after Fredro's Zemsta by Conrad Drzewiecki / Emil Wesołowski
 Soloist – Do Not Go Gentle... by Krzysztof Pastor
 Soloist – Infra by Wayne McGregor
 Conrad – Le Corsaire by Manuel Legris
 Crown Prince Rudolf – Mayerling by Kenneth MacMillan
 Harnaś – Bieguni-Harnasie by Izadora Weiss
 Count Dracula – Dracula by Krzysztof Pastor
 Duke Albrecht – Giselle by Jean Coralli, Jules Perrot / Marius Petipa / Maina Gielgud

Awards and state orders 
 2014: Jan Kiepura Theatre Music Award for the best dancer in Poland
 2016: Bronze Medal for Merit to Culture ‘Gloria Artis’
 2017: Jan Kiepura Theatre Music Award for the best classical dancer in Poland
 2022: Jan Kiepura Theatre Music Award for the best classical dancer in Poland for the role of Crown Prince Rudolf in the ballet Mayerling by Kenneth MacMillan

References 

1985 births
Russian male ballet dancers
Living people
Principal dancers